Associated Artists Productions, Inc. (a.a.p.)  later known as United Artists Associated  was an American distributor of theatrical feature films and short subjects for television. Associated Artists Productions was the copyright owner of the Popeye shorts by Paramount Pictures, and the pre-1948 color Looney Tunes and Merrie Melodies series of shorts produced by Warner Bros.

History

Associated Artists 
Associated Artists was founded in 1948 by Eliot Hyman. It handled syndication of around 500 films, including the Republic Pictures and Robert L. Lippert libraries, but both companies soon entered television distribution. It also handled syndication for Monogram Pictures  and Producers Releasing Corporation.

In 1951, Hyman sold the company to David Baird's Lansing Foundation, which in turn sold it to the startup company Motion Pictures for Television (MPTV), where Hyman served as a consultant. Hyman also became a partner in Mouline Productions, the producers of Moby Dick, while financing and producing other films and TV projects.

Associated Artists Productions 
In July 1954, Hyman launched another TV distribution company which used the Associated Artists name, Associated Artists Productions, Inc., with the purchase of the syndication rights to the Universal Sherlock Holmes films from MPTV. His son Ken served as vice-president. Associated Artists Productions also acquired distribution rights to Johnny Jupiter, Candid Camera, thirteen Artcinema Associates feature films, thirty-seven Western films, and three serials. In March 1956, Hyman's company was acquired by investment firm PRM, Inc., headed by Lou Chesler.

PRM closed the purchase of the entire pre-December 1949 Warner Bros. Pictures library in February 1956 for $21 million, with a.a.p. and its theatrical subsidiary Dominant Pictures handling distribution sales. On December 5, 1956, PRM changed its name to Associated Artists Productions Corp.

a.a.p. also purchased the Popeye cartoons produced by Fleischer Studios and Famous Studios from Paramount Pictures on June 11, 1956. This purchase and the Warner Bros. cartoon package combined gave a.a.p. a library of over 568 theatrical cartoon shorts, which would be staples of children's television for many years.

In January 1957, a.a.p announced plans to purchase the short subject library of Metro-Goldwyn-Mayer for $4.5 million. Around 900 shorts would be included in the package such as the Tom and Jerry cartoons and Pete Smith comedies, among others. Although the deal was nearly finalized, it fell through, reportedly due to the price of the sale. MGM would then distribute the shorts themselves through their own in-house television subsidiary Metro TV.

National Telefilm Associates announced plans to buy control of AAP Corp. on November 18, 1957. By December 16, 1957, control of a.a.p. was the subject of litigation which was passed on to the New York Supreme Court between the parties of a.a.p., National Telefilm Associates, and Harris minority shareholder group.

United Artists Associated 
The company was acquired by United Artists (UA) in 1958, with UA borrowing the full amount $27 million from Manufacturers's Trust when a.a.p. shareholders needed cash quickly. The a.a.p. purchase did come with the uncollected accounts' receivable amount around the purchase price. The resulting division was named United Artists Associated, Inc. (u.a.a.). u.a.a. made a deal to distribute Beany and Cecil internationally. With the twin syndicated packages of Looney Tunes/Merrie Melodies and Popeye, u.a.a. took a look at a number of shorts in the a.a.p./pre-1950 WB library that appealed to children and packaged them in a third group known as The Big Mac Show, which has a cartoon wrap around.

Distribution rights 
The material a.a.p. bought from Warner Bros. Pictures included nearly all of the features produced and distributed by Warner Bros. prior to 1950, and the live-action short subjects released prior to September 1, 1948.

The cartoon library included every color Looney Tunes and Merrie Melodies short released prior to August 1, 1948, and nearly all of the Merrie Melodies produced by Harman-Ising Productions from 1931 to 1933. The remaining black-and-white Merrie Melodies shorts made from 1933 to 1934 and the black-and-white Looney Tunes shorts were not included in the library as the TV rights were sold to Guild Films in 1955. Former Warner cartoon director Bob Clampett was hired to catalog the Warner cartoon library.

Film archive 
In 1969, the United Artists Corporation presented to the Library of Congress the earliest surviving preprint material from the pre-1950 film library of Warner Bros. (including First National library). The collection contains 200 silent features (1918–29), 800 sound features (1926–50), 1,800 sound shorts (1926–48), and 337 Looney Tunes and Merrie Melodies shorts (1931–48). While consisting largely of Warner Bros. releases, the collection includes nearly two hundred sound features released by Monogram Pictures Corporation between 1936 and 1946 and 231 Popeye cartoons produced by Fleischer Studios and Famous Studios released between 1933 and 1957. Most motion pictures exist in the original black-and-white/Technicolor camera negatives. The Library is converting those items on nitrate to safety film stock and has obtained reference prints for seventy of the better known Warner Bros. features, such as Gold Diggers of 1935 (1935), High Sierra (1941), I Am a Fugitive from a Chain Gang (1932), The Jazz Singer (1927), and Little Caesar (1930). There are no United Artists films (such as James Bond and The Pink Panther franchise; these are owned by Metro-Goldwyn-Mayer) in the United Artists Collection. The early synchronized sound Vitaphone shorts are lacking accompanying sound discs.

This is a large collection of nitrate negatives and masters, which are still undergoing transfer to acetate stock. Most of the safety film copies exist only in the preservation master stage, limiting accessibility for viewing and duplication. Some years ago, the Library of Congress obtained 16mm prints (though many are television prints, flat in picture quality and occasionally edited) for the pre-1950 Warner Bros. features. Additional prints have been added to the collection, ranging from "reject fine grain master positives" (copies made for preservation but deemed inadequate) suitable for reference use, to high-quality 35mm prints reserved for theatrical projection. United Artists also sent 16mm prints of most of the Warner Bros. and Monogram films to the Wisconsin Center for Film and Theater Research, such as My Four Years in Germany (1918), Conductor 1492 (1924), Midnight Lovers (1926) and Joe Palooka in Triple Cross (1951).

Titles and holdings are listed in the various M/B/RS catalogs. There are a number of published reference books on Warner Bros. films. Copyrights are still in effect for most of the films in this collection; a donor restriction also applies. United Artists has passed through various hands, but current ownership of this material resides with Turner Entertainment Co.

Ownership of properties 
Metro-Goldwyn-Mayer purchased United Artists, including the a.a.p. library, from Transamerica Corporation in May 1981 and became MGM/UA Entertainment Co.

Turner Broadcasting System (via Turner Entertainment Co.) took over the library in 1986 during Ted Turner's brief ownership of MGM/UA. When Turner sold back the MGM/UA production unit, he kept the MGM library, including the Warner Bros. films and Popeye cartoons from the a.a.p. library, for his own company.

On June 16, 1982, Warner Communications began to buy back rights to the pre-1950 Warner Bros. library (with the pre-1948 Warner Bros. live-action and animation shorts) from MGM/UA for $100 million in cash. The MGM-Warner deal was terminated on July 28 of that same year, after two companies failed to complete acquisitions of MGM/UA's record company asset and the pre-1950 Warner Bros. film libraries; the main reason is that the negotiations fell apart because of dozens of unresolved points, probably relating to the oldest Warner Bros. films. The Warner Bros. film libraries were reunited in 1996 when Time Warner, then the parent company of Warner Bros., bought Turner. Turner remains the copyright owner in name only to the former Associated Artists Productions properties, while Warner Bros. Discovery handles their distribution.

Subsidiaries 
 a.a.p. Records, Inc. was a music arm of a.a.p., which distributed the Official Popeye TV Album.
 United Telefilms Limited was the Canadian division of a.a.p., which existed around the same time. Live action films used a variation of the main a.a.p. logo, but the initials "UTL" would be spelled out, and a notice at the bottom said "Distributed in Canada by United Telefilms Limited".
 United Telefilm Records was a music label of United Telefilms.
 UT Records, Tel Records, and Warwick Records were  subsidiaries of United Telefilm Records.
 Dominant Pictures Corporation was a subsidiary of a.a.p., which distributed the features that the company purchased to theaters. It re-released a number of films from the pre-1950 WB library, as well as a number of British films which a.a.p. bought the rights to. Dominant also sold and/or leased 16mm prints of WB library titles to non-theatrical rental libraries. The subsidiary was later folded into UA's main theatrical distribution arm after the company was sold to UA. Some pre-1931 WB library is considered lost.

References 

1948 establishments in New York City
1958 disestablishments in New York (state)
1958 mergers and acquisitions
American companies established in 1948
American companies disestablished in 1958
Entertainment companies based in New York City
Film distributors of the United States
Mass media companies established in 1948
Mass media companies disestablished in 1958
Television syndication distributors